J. Douglas McCullough is an American lawyer and former judge of the North Carolina Court of Appeals. McCullough retired in 2017.

Education and career
After earning a history degree from the University of North Carolina at Chapel Hill in 1967 and a Juris Doctor degree  from the University of South Carolina in 1970, McCullough served in the United States Marine Corps, retiring as a colonel in the  Marine Corps Reserves. McCullough worked as legislative counsel for New Mexico Senator Harrison Schmitt, as a counsel to the United States Senate, and finally as an Assistant United States Attorney in the eastern district of North Carolina from 1981 through 1996, when he left to enter private practice.

In November 2000, McCullough was elected to the North Carolina Court of Appeals with just over 50 percent of the vote, defeating incumbent Clarence Horton.

Personal life
He is married to Lucci McCullough and has two children. He resides in Atlantic Beach, NC.

On October 7, 2006, McCullough was charged with drunk driving.  He pleaded guilty to driving while impaired on April 3, 2007.

2008 re-election campaign
McCullough is a registered Republican, but in his 2008 bid for re-election, he cited bipartisan support from notables such as former NC Supreme Court Chief Justices Burley Mitchell (a Democrat) and I. Beverly Lake Jr. (a Republican).  He also enjoyed support from former North Carolina Court of Appeals Judges S. Gerald Arnold, Sidney S. Eagles, K. Edward Greene, and Albert S. Thomas Jr.

McCullough was criticized in 2007 for implying that he and other incumbent Republican incumbents should be re-elected because they would favor Republicans in an anticipated lawsuit over redistricting. An ethics complaint was filed against him as a result of his comments.
In response to the complaint, the state Judicial Standards Commission said it would not punish McCullough, but it also said that it had made "an effort to ensure such conduct is not repeated."

McCullough was defeated in the November 2008 election by state District Court judge Cheri Beasley.

2010 election
McCullough won a new term on the Court of Appeals in 2010, when he came in second in the first round, but won the second round, of the first use of instant runoff voting for a statewide election in North Carolina. He narrowly defeated appointed incumbent judge Cressie Thigpen.

External links

 Official biography 
 Sea of Greed (book by Doug McCullough)

Footnotes

Living people
Assistant United States Attorneys
North Carolina Court of Appeals judges
United States Attorneys for the Eastern District of North Carolina
United States Marine Corps officers
University of North Carolina at Chapel Hill alumni
University of South Carolina alumni
Year of birth missing (living people)